ABC Austin may refer to:

KVUE in Austin, Texas
KAAL in Austin, Minnesota